Gregorio II Boncompagni (7 July 1642 – 1 January 1707) was an Italian nobleman and the 5th Duke of Sora. He was the grand-nephew of Pope Gregory XIII

He married Giustina Gallio (29 October 1644 – 21 July 1679) and then, when she died, he married Ippolita Ludovisi on 19 October 1681. The Boncompagni-Ludovisi union lasted until the French Revolution and included the development of the Archivio Boncompagni-Ludovisi held by The Vatican.

Gregorio and Ippolita had six children:
 Hugo (1684–1686) died young
 Maria Eleonora (1686–1745), Princess of Piombino, married Antonio Boncompagni
 Constance (1687–1768), married  Vincenzo Giustiniani, Prince of Bassano
 Maria Teresa (1692–1744), married Urbano Barberini, Prince of Palestrina
 Giulia (1695–1751), married Marco Ottoboni, Duke of Fiano
 Anna Maria (1696–1752), married Gian Vincenzo Salviati, Duke of Giuliano

References

1642 births
1707 deaths
17th-century Italian nobility
People from the Province of Frosinone